The St. Helen's Cathedral also known as the Cathedral of Santa Elena de Uairén is a religious building belonging to the Catholic Church. It is located in the town of Santa Elena de Uairén in the Gran Sabana municipality, Bolivar State, in southeastern Venezuela near the border with Brazil.

As its name implies, the cathedral was dedicated to St. Helen (Santa Elena). Its origin dates back to the early 1950s when the Capuchins promoted its construction with stones brought from around the city. It is a popular tourist site, and is one of the most visited places in the town due to its history and architecture.

See also
Roman Catholicism in Venezuela

References

Roman Catholic cathedrals in Venezuela
Buildings and structures in Santa Elena de Uairén
Buildings and structures in Bolívar (state)